Ferland-et-Boilleau is a municipality in the Canadian province of Quebec, located in Le Fjord-du-Saguenay Regional County Municipality. This municipality is located on Route 381 relatively near Saguenay.

Climate

References

External links

Municipalities in Quebec
Incorporated places in Saguenay–Lac-Saint-Jean